Darbo is a surname. Notable people with the surname include:

 Alieu Darbo (born 1992), Gambian footballer
 Arman Darbo (born 2001), French-American actor
 Clément Darbo (born 1986), French rugby union player
 Patrika Darbo (born 1948), née Davidson, American actress

See also
 Barbo